Ceritoturris bittium is a species of sea snail, a marine gastropod mollusk in the family Horaiclavidae

It was formerly included within the family Pseudomelatomidae.

Description
The length of the shell attains 7 mm.

(Original description) The minute shell has a blunt protoconch. The second whorl shows a peripheral keel. The seven subsequent whorls are moderately rounded, axially and spirally sculptured whorls. The siphonal canal is almost obsolete.

Distribution
This marine species occurs off Hawaii.

References

External links
 
  Tucker, J.K. 2004 Catalog of recent and fossil turrids (Mollusca: Gastropoda). Zootaxa 682:1–1295.

bittium
Gastropods described in 1924